The Revista Brasileira de Chímica was a peer-reviewed scientific journal of chemistry that was established in 1929 by the Sociedade Brasileira de Chímica. In 1932 the name changed to Revista da Sociedade Brasileira de Química. Publication was suspended between December 1933 to January 1936 and ceased in 1951 because the Sociedade Brasileira de Química was incorporated in the Associação Brasileira de Química. With the founding of the second Sociedade Brasileira de Química, the publication of Química Nova in 1978 and the Journal of the Brazilian Chemical Society in 1990 started. Química Nova is also subtitled as Revista da Sociedade Brasileira de Química, indicating its historical origin.

Further reading 
 C.A.L. Filgueiras, Química Nova 19, p. 445 (1996):

External links 
 Associação Brasileira de Química

Chemistry journals
1929 establishments in Brazil
1951 disestablishments in Brazil
Defunct journals
Publications established in 1929
Publications disestablished in 1951
Portuguese-language journals
Academic journals published by learned and professional societies of Brazil